Marjana Michailowna Gaponenko (born 6 September 1981) is a German writer born in Odesa, Ukraine.

Life 
Marjana Gaponenko spent her childhood and youth in Odessa. After leaving school, she studied German at the University of Odessa and started to write poems and publish. In Germany she was initially promoted by Erik Martin in Muschelhaufen, and she became known to a wider circle of readers. In 2000, she made her debut with the poetry collection How tearless knights. In 2001 she was one of the candidates for the title " Author of the Year" magazine Deutsche Sprachwelt. in 2010 published the first novel, Annushka flower, the Residenz Verlag. Poems have been translated into English, French, Italian, Polish, Romanian and Turkish. She is a member of the Author Forum The Golden Fish.

In her novel Who is Martha ? (2012), two old men spend their last days in a posh Vienna Hotel and wait for death. "As amazing as the young [author ] ", Volker Hage wrote in Der Spiegel, "also her novel Jubilee of the creation and its wonders is full of joie de vivre, also when it comes to last things". The Frankfurter Allgemeine Zeitung considers that the author with the work that was awarded the Adelbert von Chamisso Prize, " created with Luka Lewadski a quirky and idiosyncratic character like from a story by Isaac Babel [has] a childish old man, whose last gasp finds against death expression in a language that balances the oscillation of waking and dream, of melancholic nostalgia and hunger for life."

Works 
 Wie tränenlose Ritter. Gedichte, 2000, .
 Tanz vor dem Gewitter. Gedichte, 2001.
 Freund. Gedichte, 2002.
 Prieten (Rumänisch von Daniel Pop), 2003.
 Reise in die Ferne, 2003.
 Die Löwenschule. Eine wahre Geschichte für Kinder und Erwachsene, 2008, .
 Nachtflug. Gedichte, 2007, .
 Annuschka Blume. Roman, 2010, .
 Wer ist Martha?. Roman. Suhrkamp, Berlin 2012, .

 Strohhalm in Luzifers Schweif. Erzählungen, edition miromente, 2015, .

Anthologies 
 Theo Breuer (Hg.): NordWestSüdOst. Gedichte von Zeitgenossen, 2003.
 Daniela Egger (Hg.): Austern im Schnee und andere Sommergeschichten. Eine literarische Landkarte von Lech und Zürs. 2008.
 Shafiq Naz (Hg.): Der deutsche Lyrikkalender. Jeder Tag ein Gedicht, 2009.
 Christoph Buchwald und Uljana Wolf (Hg.): Jahrbuch der Lyrik, 2009.
 Axel Kutsch (Hg.): Versnetze, Versnetze_zwei, Versnetze_drei. Deutschsprachige Lyrik, 2008, 2009, 2010.

Awards 
 2001: Autor des Jahres 2001 (Deutsche Sprachwelt).
 2001: Literaturstipendium des Künstlerdorf Schöppingens 
 2009: Frau Ava Literaturpreis
 2013: Adelbert-von-Chamisso-Preis
 2013  Literaturpreis Alpha

References

External links 

 
 
 Webseite der Schriftstellerin
 Night Flight. Review in New Books in German
 Der gute Satan. Gedichtzyklus 
 Gaponenko beim Literaturfestival Berlin
 Gaponenko im Ulmer Tagebuch

1981 births
21st-century Ukrainian women writers
21st-century novelists
Ukrainian writers in German
Ukrainian women novelists
Living people
Writers from Odesa